The 2022–23 New Taipei Kings season will be the franchise's 2nd season, its second season in the P. LEAGUE+ (PLG), its 2nd in New Taipei City. The Kings are coached by Ryan Marchand in his second year as head coach.

Draft 

The Kings' 2022 first-round draft pick was traded to New Taipei Kings in exchange for 2021 first-round draft pick.

Standings

Roster

Game log

Venice Basketball League

Preseason 

|-style="background:#fcc"
| 1 || October 9 || @Braves || L 99-114 || Byron Mullens (18) || Byron Mullens (10) || Artis, Lee K., Li (2) || Fengshan Arena3,668 || 0–1
|-style="background:#fcc"
| 2 || October 10 || Pilots || L 84-105 || Byron Mullens (29) || Quincy Davis (11) || Yang Chin-Min (4) || Fengshan Arena3,306 || 0–2

Regular season 

|-style="background:#cfc"
| 1
| November 12
| Pilots
| W 104–91
| Byron Mullens (27)
| Byron Mullens (16)
| Lee Kai-Yan (7)
| Xinzhuang Gymnasium4,493
| 1–0
|-style="background:#cfc"
| 2
| November 13
| Lioneers
| W 113–78
| Joseph Lin (28)
| Byron Mullens (9)
| Joseph Lin (7)
| Xinzhuang Gymnasium4,163
| 2–0
|-style="background:#cfc"
| 3
| November 19
| @Dreamers
| W 101–89
| Yang Chin-Min (25)
| Byron Mullens (17)
| Joseph Lin (6)
| Intercontinental Basketball Stadium3,000
| 3–0
|-style="background:#cfc"
| 4
| November 25
| Braves
| W 104–89
| Byron Mullens (23)
| Lin C., Mullens (10)
| Kenny Manigault (8)
| Xinzhuang Gymnasium4,722
| 4–0
|-style="background:#fcc"
| 5
| November 27
| Dreamers
| L 82–102
| Byron Mullens (29)
| Kenny Manigault (14)
| Lee Kai-Yan (5)
| Xinzhuang Gymnasium3,320
| 4–1

|-style="background:#cfc"
| 6
| December 2
| Pilots
| W 93–88
| Austin Daye (20)
| Byron Mullens (25)
| Lee Kai-Yan (7)
| Xinzhuang Gymnasium2,835
| 5–1
|-style="background:#fcc"
| 7
| December 4
| @Steelers
| L 95–115
| Byron Mullens (26)
| Byron Mullens (12)
| Lee Kai-Yan (6)
| Fengshan Arena3,260
| 5–2
|-style="background:#cfc"
| 8
| December 10
| @Braves
| W 103–99
| Byron Mullens (38)
| Byron Mullens (17)
| Manigault, Mullens (4)
| Taipei Heping Basketball Gymnasium6,645 || 6–2
|-style="background:#fcc"
| 9
| December 17
| @Pilots
| L 74–88
| Austin Daye (16)
| Byron Mullens (14)
| Joseph Lin (5)
| Taoyuan Arena2,632
| 6–3
|-style="background:#cfc"
| 10
| December 20
| @Steelers
| W 100–89
| Chien You-Che (16)
| Byron Mullens (12)
| Lee K., J. Lin (6)
| Fengshan Arena1,925
| 7–3
|-style="background:#cfc"
| 11
| December 23
| @Braves
| W 106–101
| Yang Chin-Min (29)
| Byron Mullens (18)
| Kenny Manigault (6)
| Taipei Heping Basketball Gymnasium6,015
| 8–3
|-style="background:#cfc"
| 12
| December 25
| @Dreamers
| W 99–90
| Byron Mullens (20)
| Byron Mullens (17)
| Kenny Manigault (8)
| Intercontinental Basketball Stadium3,000
| 9–3
|-style="background:#cfc"
| 13
| December 31
| Steelers
| W 109–86
| Byron Mullens (32)
| Byron Mullens (16)
| Lee Kai-Yan (7)
| Xinzhuang Gymnasium4,159
| 10–3

|-style="background:#cfc"
| 14
| January 1
| Braves
| W 95–83
| Byron Mullens (29)
| Byron Mullens (21)
| Kenny Manigault (11)
| Xinzhuang Gymnasium6,540
| 11–3
|-style="background:#cfc"
| 15
| January 7
| @Lioneers
| W 101–85
| Byron Mullens (23)
| Byron Mullens (21)
| Joseph Lin (7)
| Hsinchu County Stadium4,177 || 12–3
|-style="background:#fcc"
| 16
| January 14
| @Lioneers
| L 106–107
| Byron Mullens (27)
| Byron Mullens (17)
| Joseph Lin (7)
| Hsinchu County Stadium4,694
| 12–4
|-style="background:#ccc"
| PPD
| January 17
| Steelers
| colspan = 6 style="text-align:center"|Postponed
|-style="background:#cfc"
| 17
| January 29
| @Dreamers
| W 90–73
| Austin Daye (16)
| Byron Mullens (17)
| Hung Chih-Shan (5)
| Intercontinental Basketball Stadium3,000
| 13–4

|-style="background:#fcc"
| 18
| February 4
| @Braves
| L 109–111
| Kenny Manigault (23)
| Byron Mullens (11)
| Joseph Lin (7)
| Taipei Heping Basketball Gymnasium6,525
| 13–5
|-style="background:#cfc"
| 19
| February 11
| @Steelers
| W 109–102
| Austin Daye (25)
| Byron Mullens (15)
| Byron Mullens (7)
| Fengshan Arena3,150
| 14–5
|-style="background:#cfc"
| 20
| February 19
| @Lioneers
| W 102–85
| Byron Mullens (44)
| Byron Mullens (24)
| Kenny Manigault (11)
| Hsinchu County Stadium5,597
| 15–5
|-style="background:#cfc"
| 21
| February 25
| @Pilots
| W 77–73
| Yang Chin-Min (24)
| Byron Mullens (15)
| Joseph Lin (8)
| Taoyuan Arena3,789
| 16–5
|-style="background:#cfc"
| 22
| February 28
| Steelers
| W 101–88
| Byron Mullens (32)
| Byron Mullens (17)
| Joseph Lin (10)
| Xinzhuang Gymnasium6,800
| 17–5

|-style="background:#cfc"
| 23
| March 4
| @Pilots
| W 98–95
| Byron Mullens (29)
| Byron Mullens (19)
| Lee Kai-Yan (8)
| Taoyuan Arena2,669
| 18–5
|-style="background:#cfc"
| 24
| March 7
| Dreamers
| W 111–105
| Yang Chin-Min (24)
| Quincy Davis (14)
| Kenny Manigault (9)
| Xinzhuang Gymnasium2,552
| 19–5
|-style="background:#cfc"
| 25
| March 11
| Dreamers
| W 117–89
| Byron Mullens (32)
| Byron Mullens (17)
| Kenny Manigault (13)
| Xinzhuang Gymnasium3,577
| 20–5
|-style="background:#fcc"
| 26
| March 12
| Braves
| L 95–106
| Yang Chin-Min (21)
| Byron Mullens (17)
| Kenny Manigault (8)
| Xinzhuang Gymnasium4,257
| 20–6
|-style="background:#cfc"
| 27
| March 18
| @Braves
| W 97–90
| J. Lin, Manigault (21)
| Kenny Manigault (16)
| Joseph Lin (9)
| Taipei Heping Basketball Gymnasium6,862
| 21–6
|-
| 28
| March 24
| @Dreamers
| 
| 
| 
| 
| Intercontinental Basketball Stadium
| 
|-
| 29
| March 28
| Pilots
| 
| 
| 
| 
| Xinzhuang Gymnasium
| 

|-
| 30
| April 1
| Pilots
| 
| 
| 
| 
| Xinzhuang Gymnasium
| 
|-
| 31
| April 2
| Lioneers
| 
| 
| 
| 
| Xinzhuang Gymnasium
| 
|-
| 32
| April 8
| @Pilots
| 
| 
| 
| 
| Taoyuan Arena
| 
|-
| 33
| April 15
| Braves
| 
| 
| 
| 
| Xinzhuang Gymnasium
| 
|-
| 34
| April 16
| Steelers
| 
| 
| 
| 
| Xinzhuang Gymnasium
| 
|-
| 35
| April 23
| @Steelers
| 
| 
| 
| 
| Fengshan Arena
| 
|-
| 36
| April 29
| Lioneers
|
| 
| 
| 
| Xinzhuang Gymnasium
| 
|-
| 37
| April 30
| Steelers
| 
| 
| 
| 
| Xinzhuang Gymnasium
| 

|-
| 38
| May 6
| Dreamers
| 
| 
| 
| 
| Xinzhuang Gymnasium
| 
|-
| 39
| May 7
| Lioneers
| 
| 
| 
| 
| Xinzhuang Gymnasium
| 
|-
| 40
| May 13
| @Lioneers
| 
| 
| 
| 
| Hsinchu County Stadium
|

Player Statistics 
<noinclude>

Regular season

Transactions

Trades

Free Agency

Re-signed

Additions

Subtractions

Awards

Players of the Week

Players of the Month

References 

New Taipei Kings
New Taipei Kings seasons